Andi Hina (born 14 May 1996) is an Albanian footballer who most recently played as a defender for Adriatiku Mamurras in the Albanian First Division.

References

1996 births
Living people
Footballers from Gjirokastër
Albanian footballers
Association football defenders
Luftëtari Gjirokastër players
FC Kamza players
KF Adriatiku Mamurrasi players
Kategoria e Parë players